The Five Dragons Temple is a Taoist temple in Ruicheng, Shanxi Province, China. It is also known as King Guangren's Temple (广仁王庙).

The temple contains China's second oldest dated timber building, the Main Hall.  It was built in 833 and is of the Tang Dynasty. It measures five bays across and has a hip-gable roof.

Notes

References
Steinhardt, Nancy Shatzman. Liao Architecture. Honolulu: University of Hawaii, 1997. 

Taoist temples in China
Major National Historical and Cultural Sites in Shanxi
Timber framed buildings in China
Tang dynasty architecture
9th-century establishments in China
Yuncheng
Religious buildings and structures completed in 833